Chelsea Rathburn (born Jacksonville, Florida) is an American poet.

Chelsea Rathburn was raised in Miami, Florida, and earned a bachelor's degree at Florida State University and an MFA in creative writing at the University of Arkansas. Her work has appeared in Poetry, The Atlantic Monthly, The New Criterion, Hudson Review, and Pleiades, and other journals. She works as a marketing writer and an assistant professor of writing and English at Young Harris College. In recent years, she has also been elevated to the rank of director of the university's creative writing program, a significant rise in status and prestige at the university. She lives in Young Harris, Georgia, with her husband, poet James Davis May, and their daughter. While she is best known for her poetry, she is also notable for her nonfiction writing, including short- and long-form prose pieces, concerning her beliefs about home, views on class, and poverty. At present, she is perhaps most excited about her upcoming prose piece on the air traffic controllers' strike.

In March 2019, Rathburn was named poet laureate of the state of Georgia, succeeding Judson Mitcham.

Awards
 2012 Autumn House Press Poetry Prize, selected by Stephen Dunn
 2009 National Endowment for the Arts poetry fellowship 
 2005 Richard Wilbur Award, selected by Timothy Steele for The Shifting Line

Publications

Poetry collections

 

 

 Still Life with Mother and Knife: Poems (February 12, 2019; LSU Press)

Chapbook

Criticism
"Christian Wiman's "Hard Night" ", Courtland Review, WINTER 2006

Online works
"English Sonnet", Poetry February 2009

References

External links
Author's website

Writers from Jacksonville, Florida
Living people
1975 births
University of Arkansas alumni
American women poets
Chapbook writers
Poets Laureate of Georgia (U.S. state)
21st-century American women